The 140th district of the Texas House of Representatives contains parts of north-central Houston. It is one of the least-non-White Hispanic districts in the state legislature. The current Representative is Armando Walle, who was first elected in 2009.

References 

140